The Israeli Combat Intelligence Collection Corps (previously known as Field Intelligence Corps) is the newest of the IDF GOC Army Headquarters' five corps, created in April 2000 and tasked with collecting combat intelligence. It is responsible for intelligence units from the battalion level and up to the entire force. Due to the need for collecting combat intelligence and in maintaining observation networks, it is in the midst of expansion.

Structure
The corps consists of the following units:
 414th Nesher (Vulture) Field Intelligence Battalion (Southern Command – Gaza Sector)
 595th Ait (Eagle) Field Intelligence Battalion (Northern Command – Syria Sector)
 636th Nitzan (Bud) Field Intelligence Battalion (Central Command)
 727th Eitam Field Intelligence Battalion (Southern Command – Negev Sector)
 869th Shahaf (Seagull) Field Intelligence Battalion (Northern Command – Lebanon Sector)
 Field Intelligence School, also known as Center for Reconnaissance and Intelligence.
 Unit Command, in the IDF Central Command in HaKirya, Tel-Aviv

Each battalion includes foot soldiers, and female observers that control stationary cameras from a control center.

Training
Two weeks after drafting, training commanders decide where each soldier will serve (which battalion) based upon the psychological, physical, and motivational state of the soldier. The training base is in the southern region of the Negev Desert, close to Eilat.

The requirements to join as a field recon specialist is a medical profile of 82 or 97, and intelligence score of at least 40.

Infantry units
 Basic Training 16 weeks (Rifleman 05) – Combat Intelligence School
 Advanced Training 20 weeks (Scout 07) – Combat Intelligence School
 Unit Training (here each unit has its own training that takes around 2 months) – Northern, Southern and Central command

Mounted units
Starting in March 2019 recruitment was discontinued and all mounted units were converted to infantry units.
 Basic Training 8 weeks (Rifleman 03) – Combat Intelligence School
 Advanced Training 8 weeks (Scout 05) – Combat Intelligence School
 Unit Training (here each unit has its own training that takes around one month) – Northern, Southern and Central command

History
Israel has a long history of intelligence units and operations, dating back to the Palmach's  "German Platoon" (aka the Middle East Commando). After the creation of the IDF, field intelligence units were formed on an ad-hoc basis, by the Regional Commands.

In 1993, the first dedicated field intelligence unit meant for operating in any front, the Yahmam (abbreviation for Target Field Intelligence, also known as the Nitzan Commando), was created. The unit was designated to provide intelligence in real time and sighting enemy targets. It was appended to the GOC Army Headquarters and its soldiers wore black berets, even though they were under the direct command of the General Staff. During the 1982–2000 South Lebanon Conflict, it operated as an elite outfit tasked with collecting combat intelligence. After the February 4, 1997 Israeli helicopter disaster, in which the unit lost two men out of a total of 73 killed, the Supreme Court of Israel instructed to reveal their names, and consequently, the unit's existence was revealed to the public.

The unit was created as a corps in April 2000, under Amnon Sufrin. In late 2008, the GOC Army Headquarters decided to rename it to the "Combat Intelligence Collection Corps" from "Field Intelligence Corps", to emphasize its combat nature and to dissociate itself from the military intelligence directorate to which it was previously professionally subordinate to. The name was changed in November 2009.
Additionally, the corps' beret color was changed from dark green (which is associated with military intelligence) to yellow.

Chief combat intelligence Officer
The chief combat intelligence officer is a brigadier general appointed by the head of the GOC Army Headquarters. As of 2009, the chief combat intelligence officer is Eli Pollack.

References

External links

Combat Intelligence Collection Corps at the GOC Army Headquarters website 

Israeli intelligence agencies
Corps of Israel
Military Intelligence Directorate (Israel)
Military units and formations established in 2000